Arcille is a village in Tuscany, central Italy,  administratively a frazione of the comune of Campagnatico, province of Grosseto. At the time of the 2001 census its population amounted to 100.

Arcille is about 14 km from Grosseto and 12 km from Campagnatico, and it is situated close to the Ombrone river.

Main sights 
 Church of Madonna di Lourdes, main parish church of the village, it was built in 1954.
 Chapel of San Filippo Apostolo (19th century), a little church situated in Sticcianese, a few kilometres east of the centre of Arcille.

References

Bibliography 
 Aldo Mazzolai, Guida della Maremma. Percorsi tra arte e natura, Le Lettere, Florence, 1997.

See also 
 Campagnatico
 Marrucheti
 Montorsaio

Frazioni of Campagnatico